Michaël Cohen (born 13 December 1970) is a French actor. He appeared in more than fifty films since 1991.

Selected filmography

1998
La dame aux camélias
Armand Duval

References

External links 

1970 births
Living people
French male film actors